Martha Jean "The Queen" Steinberg (September 9, 1930 – January 29, 2000) was an influential African-American radio broadcaster and later was also the pastor of her own church.

She was born Martha Jean Jones in Memphis, Tennessee. Her first radio job was on Memphis's WDIA starting in 1954. There, she was one of the first female disc jockeys in the United States, with a program that included the latest R&B hits along with the typical "household hints" programming that was de rigueur at the time for female radio personalities.

In 1963 she moved to Detroit, Michigan, where she was heard on WCHB and then throughout the late 1960s and 1970s on WJLB. On July 23, 1967, Steinberg convinced WJLB to cancel its normal evening programming and she did an on-air program calling for people to calm down and stop rioting. It has been suggested that this prevented the 1967 Detroit Riot from being worse than it was. During her time at WJLB, she led the station's on-air staff in protest of the fact that the station at the time had no African-American employees outside of the air staff.

In 1980, WJLB converted from AM to the FM dial (where it remains to this day), and Steinberg's show was dropped in the process.  The former WJLB-AM became WMZK with an ethnic format.  In 1982, Steinberg purchased WMZK-AM and changed the call letters to WQBH in order to offer more gospel music oriented programming. Steinberg remained on the air at WQBH (1400 on the AM dial) until her death. WQBH is now WDTK.

She had a cameo role as a television show host in the 1973 film Detroit 9000. In 2017 she was inducted into Rhythm & Blues Hall of Fame.

She is buried in Detroit's Elmwood Cemetery.

She is featured in an episode of Little America on AppleTV.

See also
Michigan Women's Hall of Fame
WDTK

References

Further reading
Detroit African-American History Project
Paley Center for Media

1930 births
2000 deaths
Burials at Elmwood Cemetery (Detroit)
Radio personalities from Detroit
People from Memphis, Tennessee